Lars Schmidt (born 13 September 1965) is a German former professional footballer who became a coach.

References

Living people
1965 births
Association football defenders
German footballers
German football managers
Karlsruher SC players
1. FSV Mainz 05 players
Kickers Offenbach players
Bundesliga players